O0 may refer to:

 N47D20-O0, model of the BMW 5 Series
 N53B30-O0, model of the BMW N53 with improved maximum power to 268ㅡ

See also 
 kaomoji
 OO (disambiguation)
 00 (disambiguation)
 0O (disambiguation)
 Ozero